Bebearia occitana, the Occitana forester, is a butterfly in the family Nymphalidae. It is found in eastern Nigeria and western Cameroon. The habitat consists of undisturbed wet forests.

References

Butterflies described in 1989
occitana